Tomb of Horemheb may refer to either of two tombs made for the Eighteenth Dynasty pharaoh Horemheb:
Tomb of Horemheb in Saqqara, made before Horemheb became pharaoh
KV57 in the Valley of the Kings, where Horemheb was buried